Toby Driver is a multi-instrumentalist, composer, songwriter, producer, label owner, and artist, best known for his work as the leader of the experimental bands Kayo Dot and maudlin of the Well.

Driver creates the majority of the album artwork associated with these bands, performs the lead vocals and several instruments, produces the albums, and has written and arranged the music for both bands. Although several members of motW continued on when the band dissolved and reformed as Kayo Dot in 2003, Driver is the only remaining member of the original line-up of maudlin of the Well who is still consistently active with Kayo Dot.

Biography and early work 
Toby Driver was born in 1978, in Meriden, Connecticut and currently resides in New York City. He learned clarinet and piano from a young age, and during his high school years, he recorded several albums under the moniker "Spoonion" using tape recorders and a karaoke machine. He later released his favorite cuts of these albums online as collections. After playing with a handful of bands in high school, including a Nirvana and Jane's Addiction cover band, and a gothic-progressive-metal band called "Celestial Providence," Driver formed maudlin of the Well with his friends Jason Byron and Greg Massi and recorded a demo entitled Through Languid Veins (1996)

He attended Hampshire College in Amherst, MA, where he expanded maudlin of the Well, and where they recorded their second (Begat of the Haunted Oak... An Acorn), third (Odes to Darksome Spring), and fourth (For My Wife) demos which turned into their debut album My Fruit Psychobells... A Seed Combustible. During this time, Driver also studied under composer and jazz legend, Yusef Lateef, and composed, directed, and performed an oratorio for 20 musicians based on and titled after the epic poem Six Trillion Miles Before the First by Jason Byron. Sections of this piece later reappeared on motW's reunion album, Part the Second (2009).

Style and musicianship 
As evident in the bands and projects to which Driver has contributed, he generally utilizes unconventional styles of song-writing and song structure. Many songs he writes use odd time signatures, range from ten to twenty minutes in length, divert from typical riff-based structure, and employ elements of many musical genres, often shifting between these styles within the same song. Songs often incorporate musical qualities suited to styles as diverse as death metal, minimalism, chamber music, post-rock and jazz, while seldom completely conforming to any one specific genre. Driver has repeatedly denied any connection of his music to jazz, minimalism or improv. His work is strictly composed and rehearsed thoroughly, and the songs seldom see any changes after being recorded.

Driver's vocals are accordingly diverse in range and style. Driver uses a normal singing voice, screams, shouts, occasionally uses death vocals (not to be confused with former band member Jason Byron who contributes vocals in early motW also), as well as occasionally singing falsetto and using spoken word (see Kayo Dot's Choirs of the Eye and Hubardo for an example of all the styles listed above).

A multi-instrumentalist, Toby Driver is credited on various albums as playing the following instruments:
guitar (acoustic and electric)
12-string guitar
baritone guitar
bass
double bass
various keyboards including piano, organ and synthesizer
laptop mellotron
clarinet
cello
bells
percussion
gamelan

Bands

maudlin of the Well 
Driver was a founding member of maudlin of the Well in 1996 along with Jason Byron and Greg Massi. They morphed into Kayo Dot in 2003 during the process of recording what would have been motW's fourth album, and titled Kayo Dot's henceforth first album Choirs of the Eye, due to label problems and the desire to move away from being pigeonholed in the metal scene. In 2009, due to fan requests and contributions, Driver, along with Terran Olson who was also still playing with Kayo Dot, reformed maudlin of the Well to record the digital album Part the Second, reuniting with guitarists Greg Massi, Josh Seipp-Williams, and drummer Sam Gutterman. The album contained five newly released songs, some of which were composed—partially at least—in the early days of the band (as far back as 1997), with lyrics co-written by Jason Byron and Toby Driver. Maudlin of the Well's style was always described by the band as "astral metal," referencing Driver and Byron's interest in astral projection. Driver has stated that he used astral projection and lucid dreaming as methods to retrieve music from the subconscious. Maudlin of the Well's lyrics deal with this topic, as well as the subjects of ghosts and the paranormal, the occult, kabbalah, nostalgia, and betrayal. The liner notes for their companion albums, Bath and Leaving Your Body Map (2001) contain a puzzle that leads to an as-yet-unknown solution.

Kayo Dot 
Kayo Dot is Driver's main band, which began in 2003 and remains currently active. They have released eight full-length albums, an EP, a few live recordings, and a handful of remixes and singles.   Kayo Dot's musical style shifts constantly, but maintains a ubiquitous aesthetic of darkness, surrealism, impressionism, hallucination, melodrama, and musical technicality. Driver is the only consistent member, although some members who have left the band in the past have returned for recordings or special live performances. Kayo Dot has an active touring schedule, averaging four months on the road per year, and having joined bands such as Pallbearer, Earth, Pelican, and Secret Chiefs 3 on tour. Kayo Dot has worked with several record labels including John Zorn's Tzadik, Robotic Empire, Holy Roar, Aaron Turner's Hydra Head Records, Antithetic Records, The Flenser, and Driver's own imprint, Ice Level Music.

Piggy Black Cross 
Piggy Black Cross is Driver's "Dark Industrial IDM"  project with vocalist Bridget Bellavia. Thus far, they have released their music only digitally, first appearing on SoundCloud in March 2018. SputnikMusic.com has called it "a surreal, engrossing debut."

Tartar Lamb I and II 
Driver formed the side project Tartar Lamb with Mia Matsumiya in 2006. Tartar Lamb did a brief US and Canada tour in January of that year, and later recorded their album, Sixty Metonymies, with Randall Dunn in Seattle, Washington in December 2006 in the middle of another difficult winter tour. Sixty Metonymies was self-released on CD by Driver on his label, Ice Level Music. Since then, Sixty Metonymies has only been performed occasionally at local concerts in New York City when possible.

Tartar Lamb II was created in 2009 with other members of Kayo Dot and composer and clarinetist Jeremiah Cymerman. It was named a Tartar Lamb project because the compositional method that Driver invented for Sixty Metonymies was used again for the new work, which was called Polyimage of Known Exits. This incarnation of Tartar Lamb did a month-long European winter tour in 2010 opening up for Kayo Dot. A recording from this tour appears on the Kayo Dot/Tartar Lamb II live album, Kraków (2011). Tartar Lamb II also performed locally in New York City on a couple occasions but the band is currently defunct.

Vaura 
Driver also currently plays bass in the band Vaura, who released their debut album Selenelion, in 2012 through Wierd Records and their second album, The Missing, in 2013 via Profound Lore Records. The band is fronted by writer, philosopher, Blacklist singer and Azar Swan producer, Joshua Strawn, and also includes guitarist Kevin Hufnagel of Dysrhythmia and Gorguts, and drummer Charlie Schmid. The style of Vaura is an amalgam of gothic rock, progressive black-metal, and pop.

Stern 
Driver plays guitar in Stern, the experimental alien pop band auteured by the prolific composer, filmmaker, and writer Chuck Stern (formerly of Time of Orchids). The band also includes former Time of Orchids and Kayo Dot drummer Keith Abrams, and frequent Driver collaborator Tim Byrnes. Stern has released three albums as a solo act, and three more with the full band including Driver: Entitlement (2012), Bone Turquoise (2015), and Missive: Sister Ships (2018). For more information, visit: http://stern.band.

Solo work 
Driver has also been prolific as a solo act, releasing his eponymous debut In the L..L..Library Loft on John Zorn's Tzadik in 2005. In the L..L..Library Loft features four compositions in a modern classical style including guitars, drumsets, and screaming vocals. Driver composed and recorded Ichneumonidae to accompany a butoh dance performance in 2012; this was also released on Ice Level Music. Driver's next eponymous album was 2017's Madonnawhore, which contains six long, spacious, and slow sombre ballads and features drummer Keith Abrams. In the fall of 2017, Driver was commissioned to compose a piece entitled Through the Arm to Magma for the Kraków-based chamber orchestra Spółdzielnia Muzyczna for the 2017 Sacrum Profanum Festival, which also featured composers Stephen O'Malley, Aaron Turner, Jennifer Walshe, Alvin Lucier, Iancu Dumitrescu, Ana-Maria Avram, and many others. In 2018, Driver released a second album of ballads, entitled They Are the Shield, featuring violinists Pauline Kim Harris and Conrad Harris, pianist Kelly Moran, and drummer Brian Chase from the Yeah Yeah Yeahs, on Blood Music. Driver has also done a small amount of soundtrack work, including for Eric Pennycoff's short film The Pod and Kevin Endres' short film, Lazaretto. Driver’s composition, Stained Glass, was used in an installation film piece of the same title by artist Peter Hopkins Miller. Stained Glass was a featured exhibition in the 2017 Biennale di Venezia.

Bloodmist 
Driver plays bass in the free-improvised trio Bloodmist, which is led by composer, clarinetist, and producer Jeremiah Cymerman and also features composer, guitarist, synthesist, and producer Mario Diaz de Leon. Bloodmist performs occasionally around New York City, and has released one album entitled Sheen on Cymerman's imprint 5049 Records, with another forthcoming in 2019.

Sideman work and small collaborations 
Driver has also toured as the bassist of Trey Spruance's Secret Chiefs 3 for many years, has recorded vocals with Asva, Tusk, played vibraphone and clarinet for Gregor Samsa, has toured as bassist for Myrkur, has remixed for Pyramids, Candiria, and Bloody Panda, has formed more casual bands such as Clefter with Gyan Riley and Timba Harris, or Tanks with Ches Smith and Brandon Seabrook, and regularly performs around New York City with local musicians.

Ice Level Music 
Driver owns and operates the record label Ice Level Music, which was initially created to release Tartar Lamb's 2007 debut, Sixty Metonymies, but continues to be an outlet for Driver to self-release some of his own material. Ice Level Music's discography includes Tartar Lamb - Sixty Metonymies and Polyimage of Known Exits, maudlin of the Well - Part the Second,  Kayo Dot - Gamma Knife, Hubardo, and the vinyl edition of Choirs of the Eye, Ichneumonidae, and others.

Discography

As Spoonion 1
 Community of Sinners
 Chiffon Gob
 Acoustic Sex
 Clone
 According to the Law
 Dreaming Winter Awake

As Spoonion 2
 On the Thoughts and Principles of Dragons
 A Tree and Its Fruit
 Space Music
 How to Find God
 Opposition Day
 The Secret Violence of Poison

Maudlin of the Well 
 Through Languid Veins (demo, 1996)
 Begat of the Haunted Oak: An Acorn (demo, 1997)
 Odes to Darksome Spring (demo, 1997)
 For My Wife (demo, 1998)
 My Fruit Psychobells...A Seed Combustible (1999)
 Bath (2001)
 Leaving Your Body Map (2001)
 The Secret Song (single, 2001)
 Part the Second (2009)

Kayo Dot 
 Choirs of the Eye (2003)
 Dowsing Anemone with Copper Tongue (2006)
 Don't Touch Dead Animals (2006) (split LP with Bloody Panda)
 Blue Lambency Downward (2008)
 Champions of Sound 2008 (2009) (split double 7" with Pelican, Stove Bredsky, and Zozobra)
 Toying with the Insanities Vol. 1 (2009) (Candiria Remix album)
 Coyote (2010)
 Stained Glass EP (2010)
 Gamma Knife (2012)
 Hubardo (2013)
 Coffins on Io (2014)
 Plastic House on Base of Sky (2016)
 Blasphemy (2019)
 Moss Grew on the Swords and Plowshares Alike (2021)

Solo work 
 In the L..L..Library Loft (2005)
 The Pod OST (2013)
 Ichneumonidae (2014)
 Madonnawhore (2017)
 Live at Roulette, March 2017 (2017, digital only)
 They Are the Shield (2018)

Tartar Lamb I 
 60 Metonymies (2007)

Tartar Lamb II 
 Polyimage of Known Exits (2011)
 Krakow (2011)

Piggy Black Cross 
 Always Just Out Of R.E.A.C.H. (Robotic Eclosion After Coming Hylozoic) (2018)

Bloodmist 
 Sheen (2016)
 Phos (2020)

Alora Crucible 
 Thymiamatascension (2021)

Other appearances 
 Tusk – The Resisting Dreamer (2007) (vocals)
 Gregor Samsa – Rest (2007) (clarinet, guitar)
 Pyramids – Pyramids (2008) (remix of "The Echo of Something Lovely")
 Gregor Samsa – Over Air (2009) (clarinet, vibraphone)
 Asva – Presence of Absences (2011) (vocals)
 Bloody Panda – Summon: Invocation (2011) (remix of "Hashira")
 Vaura - Selenelion (2012)
 Stern - Entitlement EP (2012)
 Vaura - The Missing (2013)
 Secret Chiefs 3 - Book of Souls: Folio A (2013)
 Ichneumonidae with Timba Harris & Russell Greenberg (2014, digital only)
 David T. Little & Third Coast Percussion – Haunt Of Last Nightfall (2014) (bass)
 Stern - Bone Turquoise (2015)
 Jeremiah Cymerman's Bloodmist - Sheen (2016)
 Jeremiah Cymerman's Bloodmist -  Chaos of Memory (2017, digital only)
 Stern - Missive: Sister Ships (2018)
 Extra Life - Secular Works, Vol. 2 (2022)

References

External links
Official Kayo Dot website.
Toby Driver's solo works
Label page of Ice Level Music

Living people
1978 births
American multi-instrumentalists
Tzadik Records artists
Hampshire College alumni
Musicians from New York City
Place of birth missing (living people)
American vibraphonists